Kent A. Carstairs (born c. 1947) is a Canadian curler,  and a .

Carstairs began curling at age 26 in Toronto, Ontario. He moved to Midland, Ontario in 1973 where he teamed up with Russ Howard. He is now a resident of Victoria Harbour, Ontario. He works as an accounts manager for Hughes ELCAN.

Awards
Canadian Curling Hall of Fame: 1991
Curl Manitoba Hall of Fame: 1991
Midland Ontario Sports Hall of Fame:
1996 – Russ Howard Curling Team 1987 World Champions
2002 – 1975-76 Ontario Curling Association Colts Championship Rink

Teams

References

External links
 
 Kent Carstairs – Curling Canada Stats Archive
 Kent Carstairs - Ontario, Canada | Professional Profile | LinkedIn

1940s births
Living people
Brier champions
Canadian male curlers
Curlers from Simcoe County
People from Midland, Ontario
People from Penetanguishene
World curling champions